Born in 1973, near Paris, France, multimedia artist Stéphane Blanquet is a prolific figure in the contemporary art scene since the end of the 1980s.

Biography

Contemporary art 
Born in 1973, near Paris, France, multimedia artist Stéphane Blanquet is a prolific figure in the contemporary art scene since the end of the 1980s. He creates and is involved in the graphzine scene, art installations, artwork, urban art, animation movies, theater, books, publishing, art direction…

When he was a child, he once watched the 3D movie Creature from the Black Lagoon on TV with his grandparents. The experience had a strong impact on him and he has, since then, been strongly interested by the myths and codes of popular culture: illustrated magazines, joke shops, magic tricks, optical illusions and fairground art.

In the 1990s, Blanquet was very active both as an artist and a publisher and became one of the leaders of the underground art scene. His art was exhibited at the "Regard Moderne" gallery/library (Paris, France) in 1993 and 1996, in the USA and in Canada. It has been published in Blab! (USA), AX (Japan) and in Europe. In 1996, he received the prestigious Alph Art du fanzine prize at the Angoulême International Comics Festival for his work as a publisher.

In 2001, a major retrospective of his work was displayed at the Maison de la culture de Tournai (Belgium). It was followed by numerous solo and group shows throughout the decade: Blab! Exhibition in San Diego (USA) and at the Luzerne Museum (Switzerland), the Cult Fiction exhibition at the Hayward Gallery in London and 6 others venues in the UK, a solo show in Fumetto (Luzerne, Switzerland), another one in Aix-en-Provence (France)…

In 2008, he created an outdoor mural for the Kabinett Passage in the "Vienna Museumsquartier" in Austria. It was his first foray in urban art.

In 2009, he presented a major installation for the "Quintet" exhibition at the Musée d'Art Contemporain of Lyon. It had a strong impact on a whole generation of artists.

In 2010, he spent 3 weeks in Japan, where he had a solo show at the Span Art Gallery in Tokyo and participated in various events.

He also presented installations in Singapore: in 2012, "Distorted forest" at the Night Lights festival and, in 2013, the "Glossy Dreams in Depths" installation at the Singapore Art Museum, covering 250 m2 seen by 100,000 visitors.

Animation movies 

In 1997, he went into animation movies and made "Le mélange des couleurs" for the French broadcasting company Canal +. In 2005, the "Les réanimations" DVD, which contained all his animation movies to date, was released. In 2012, he was invited by the university Sup Info Com Arles to create a movie, "Cornea", with a team of students. The movie was later shown at numerous festivals and exhibitions (in 2014, at the Museum of Fine Arts of Boston - USA).

Graphic novels 

In 2001, his first graphic novel "La nouvelle aux pis" was published by Cornélius. It was followed by numerous other publications: "Le Noir Seigneur", "Bouquet Bonheur", "Chochottes" ...

In 2007, a second graphic novel "La Vénéneuse aux deux éperons" was published, again by Cornélius. It was chosen as one of the 10 most aesthetically outstanding books published in France that year (Concours des plus beaux livres français). Various titles have been published in Japan, the USA, Spain, Italy, Brazil, etc.

Art for a younger audience 

From 2002 onward, he started creating works aimed at a younger audience. He illustrated demanding texts for important French publishing companies, for example: "La vieille Chéchette" by Louise Michel (2006 - Albin Michel), "The Snow Queen" by Hans Christian Andersen (2010 - Gallimard). He also created installations and artworks: in 2013, in Singapore, he exhibited an installation at the Art Garden festival for children and families, organized by the Singapore Art Museum.

Theater 

In 2005, he met Jean Lambert-wild. It was the beginning of a long and fruitful collaboration in theater. At the "Comédie de Caen", a French national theater, he worked on stage and costume design, play writing and direction. In 2008, the play he co-authored and co-designed "Comment ai-je pu tenir là-dedans" was very successful at the Festival d'Avignon and has been shown 200 times including in Japan and Korea. He is now working on a new play adapted from Shakespeare's Richard III.

Art direction 

In 2007, he was appointed "Ocular Director", a sort of art director, responsible for the image and the visual branding for the "comédie de Caen". He created a strong image and his work has helped increase the number of visitors (x3 in 5 years). Today, he is the art director in charge of the "Théâtre de l'Union", Limoges, where he has followed Jean Lambert-Wild.

Publishing 

Since 2007, with the publishing house "United Dead Artists", he published monographs (Roland Topor, Gary Panter, Tanaami Keiichi…), magazines (Tendon Revolver, Muscle Carabine, Tranchée Racine…) and art objects under the brand "United Dead Toys". He published the work of about 200 artists in some 100 publications. The magazine "Tranchées Racine" has a print-run of 4,000. He also created a newsstand to present the publications which is regularly shown in museums and cultural centres.

Collaboration 

Recently, he started working with commercial companies. In 2014, he created for Paramount Pictures an artwork that was used to promote the new "Teenage Mutant Ninja Turtle" movie. He also set a foot in fashion: he worked with the Belgium fashion brand KRJST.

Achievements

Main exhibitions and installations 
 Singapore Art Museum (Singapore), "Glossy Dreams in Depths", large scale installation, 2013
 Night Lights Singapore (Singapore), "Distorted forest", large scale night time installation, 2012
 Museum of Narrative Arts (San Diego, USA), "Survey Select: A Narrative Art Exhibition", 2010
 Musée d'Art Contemporain MAC Lyon (Lyon, France), "Quintet", large-scale installation, 2009
 Marianna Kistler Beach Museum of Art (Manhattan, Kansas, USA), Blab! Retrospective, 2008
 Musée des Arts Décoratifs (Paris, France), "Toy Comics", 2007
 Hayward Gallery (London, UK), "Cult Fiction", travelling group show, 2007
 Périscopages (Rennes, France),"Exposition Blanquet aux Ateliers du Vent", 2005
 Festival international de BD de Sierre (Sierre, Switzerland), "Chambre avec vue sur mes cauchemars (1st version)", 2004

Solo shows 
 MAD 2015, Multiple Art Days at La Maison Rouge, Paris, France, 2015
 Galerie Arts Factory (Paris, France), "Vide Point . Rose Trou", 2014
 Maison des Arts (Evreux, France), 2014
 Musée de l'Erotisme (Paris, France), "Rendez-vous moi en toi", 2013
 Médiathèque Jean Falala + 3 other venues (Reims, France), "Machoires Noires", 2012
 WHARF, Center for Contemporary Art (Caen, France), "Le boyau noir", 2012
 Span Art Gallery (Tokyo, Japan), "Blanquet plagues Tokyo, 1st round", 2012
 Galerie Arts Factory (Paris, France), "Blanquet s'ouvre la panse", 2007
 Chapelle des Pénitents Blancs (Aix en Provence, France), "Labyrinthique intestinale", 2006
 Les Caniches Modernes (Troyes, France), 2006
 Médiathèque Hermeland (Saint-Herblain, France), 2006
 Maison de la Culture et des Loisirs (Gérardmer, France), 2005
 Kapelica Gallery (Ljubljana, Slovenia), "Črvivo jabolko", 2004
 La mauvaise réputation (Bordeaux, France), "Exposition Blanquet", 2004
 La Marque Jaune & le cinéma Churchill (Liège, Belgium), "Rétrographie", 2002
 Galerie Arts Factory (Paris, France), "Le Roi des Crabes", 2002
 Maison de la culture (Tournai, Belgium), "Rétrographie", 2001
 Librairie-galerie Un regard moderne (Paris, France), 1996
 ??? (Montréal, Canada), A l'intérieur des têtes, 1995
 Librairie-galerie Un regard moderne (Paris, France), "Exposition posthume",1993

Group shows 

 United Dead Artists pop-up store (Paris, France), "Chapelle", 2015
 Médiathèque Hermeland (Saint-Herblain, France), "Exposer / s'exposer : 20 ans d'arts graphiques", 2014
 Maison des Arts Georges Pompidou, centre d'art contemporain, (Carjac, France), "Alternatives", 2013
 Gallery 7 (New York, USA), "Anxiety", 2013
 Zentralinstitut für Kunstgeschichte (Munich, Germany), "Graphzines 1975–2013: publications by French underground artists", 2013
 Arts factory X Galerie Lavigne (Paris, France), "United Dead artists: 400 dessins à vif", 2012
 Université de Caen (Caen, France), "Kiosque United Dead artists", 2012
 Halle Saint Pierre (Paris, France), "Hey! Modern art et pop culture", 2011
 Museum of Narrative Arts (San Diego, USA), "Survey Select: A Narrative Art Exhibition", 2010
 Musée de l'Abbaye Sainte-Croix (Les Sables d'Olonne, France), "Alternatives grafikes", 2010
 Dirty Deal Gallery (Riga, Latvia), "Mental Discharge", 2010
 Musée d'Art Contemporain MAC Lyon (Lyon, France), "Quintet", large-scale installation, 2009
 Théâtre Forum Meyrin (Meyrin, Switzerland), "Même pas peur", 2009
 Toppan Museum, (Tokyo, Japan), "World Book Design 2007–2008", 2008
 Galerie Anatome (Paris, France), "Les Plus Beaux Livres Français 2007", 2008
 Bongoût (Berlin, Germany), "Mollusk Kollektiv", 2008
 Marianna Kistler Beach Museum of Art (Manhattan, Kansas, USA), Blab! Retrospective, 2008
 Musée des Arts Décoratifs (Paris, France), "Toy Comics", 2007
 Hayward Gallery (London, UK), "Cult Fiction", travelling group show, 2007
 Tri Postal (Lille, France), "Skate", 2006
 Centre culturel Una Volta (Bastia, France), "13èmes Rencontres de la BD et de l'illustration", 2005
 Museum of Art Lucerne (Lucerne, Switzerland), "Blab! Exhibition", 2005
 Track 16 gallery (Santa Monica, CA, USA), "The Blab! show", 2005
 Arts Factory (Paris, France), "Vertige Vision: 200 dessins non conformes", 2005
 Babel Festival (Athens, Greece), "Athens International Comics Festival", 2005
 Galerie Yaralt (Rouen, France), "Eyeslide", 2005
 Meeting space for visual culture (Leuven, Belgium), "In Between", 2005
 Foster Art (London, UK), "The postcard project", 2004
 Galerie Haus Schwarzenberg (Berlin, Germany), "Bilder & Bücher", 2003
 Gallery Copro/Nason (Culver City, California, USA), "The Haunted Doll House", 2003
 Gallery Extrapool (Nijmegen, the Netherlands), 2003

Events 
 Comédie de Caen (Caen, France), "Festival des boréales", 2012
 Night Lights Singapore (Singapore), "Distorted forest", large scale night time installation, 2012
 Rock en Seine (Paris, France), "Rock Art", 2009
 24ème salon du livre et de la presse jeunesse (Montreuil, France), "ClacClac", 2008
 Festival international BD-FIL (Lausanne, Switzerland), "Sur l'épiderme", 2006
 Quinzaine de la BD 2005 (Bruxelles, Belgium), 2005
 10ème festival de bande dessinée de Haute Normandie (Darténal, France), 2005
 19ème festival de la BD de Colomiers (Colomiers, France), "mi-steak / mi-raisin", 2005
 Festival international de BD de Sierre (Sierre, Switzerland), "cubix rooms", 2004
 Berliner Comicfestival (Berlin, Germany), "Kinderkids in Wonderland", 2003
 4ème rencontre autour des illustrateurs et éditeurs bd indépendants (Livry-Gargan, France), 2002

Animation movies 
 Cornée (2012)
 Mauvaise graine (2004, 4 min), pilote for a feature-long animation movie
 La Peau de chagrin (2003, 10 min)
 L'Épine de succession (2001)26
 Histoire muette (2000, 26x1 min)
 Mon placard (1999, 8 min)
 Vivement l'an 2000 (1998, 4x25 s)
 Le Mélange des couleurs (1997, 2 min)

Publishing 
 Chacal Puant
 La Monstrueuse
 United Dead Artists
 United Dead Toys

Theatre and contemporary dance 
 Ubu Roi, 2017
 Richard III - Loyaulté me lie, 2016
 Mon amoureux noueux pommier, 2012
 War Sweet War, 2012
 Comment ai-je pu tenir là dedans, 2010
 Sade Songs, 2006
 En sourdine, 2006

Publications (selection)

Monographs 
 "Monographie lacrymale", l'An 02, 2005 (preface by Gaspar Noé)
 "Rétrographie", Maison de la culture de Tournai + United Dead Artists, 2001

Exhibition catalogs 
 "Rendez vous Moi en Toi", 100 pages, United Dead Artists, 2013
 "Le Boyau Noir", Wharf, Centre d'art contemporain de Basse-Normandie (France), 2012
 "Quintet", Musée d'Art Contemporain with Editions Glénat (France), 2009
 "Toy Comics", L'Association (France), 2007
 "Cult Fiction: art and comics", by Paul Gravett and Emma Mahony, Cornerhouse Publications (UK), 2006

Art books 
 "Vide point . Rose trou", Re:Surgo (Germany), 2014 
 "Rendez vous Moi en Toi", United Dead Artists (France), 2013
 "Miel de fond", Bongout (Germany), 2010
 "Town of tiny loops", with Mami Chan, L'armada production (France), 2010
 "La chair nue s'articule", Alain Beaulet éditeur (France), 2008
 "Ratures N°1" & "Ratures N°2", Alain Beaulet éditeur (France), 2006
 "Le fond du jardin", B.ü.L.b comix (Switzerland), 2005
 "Troubles sur l'oreiller", Alain Beaulet éditeur (France), 2004
 "Sur l'épiderme", Alain Beaulet éditeur (France), 2003
 "Le Fantôme des autres", Drozophile (Switzerland), 2000
 "Mon méchant moi", Chacal Puant (France), 1996
 "Badadaboum", Istvan Vamos Agudo Apdo (Spain), 1996
 "À l'intérieur... des têtes", Mille Putois (Canada) 1995
 "Canned monster", Chacal Puant (France), 1995
 "Le petit livre", Chacal Puant (France), 1994
 "Ça va mal", Chacal Puant (France), 1994
 "Ultimatum gangster poche", Chacal Puant (France), 1994

Graphic novels 
 "A pior Noticia", (La nouvelle aux pis), A Bolha Editora (Brazil), 2014
 "De zwarte heer / druk 1" (Le Noir Seigneur), Luitingh Sijthoff (The Netherland), 2011
 "Donjon Monster 6 - Der schwarze Fürst" (Le Noir Seigneur), Reprodukt (Germany), 2008
 "La mazmorra monstruos 4. El señor negro", (Le Noir Seigneur), Norma Editorial S.a. (Spain), 2008
 "La Vénéneuse à deux éperons", Cornélius (France), 2005
 "幸福の花束" (Bouquet Bonheur), Parol-Sha (Japan), 2005
 "Chocottes au sous-sol", La joie de lire, 2005
 "Donjon Monster Tome 4, Le Noir Seigneur", Delcourt, 2003
 "Les Gens des Bois", United Dead Artists (France), 2003
 "Bouquet Bonheur", 60 pages, Editions Cornélius, 2002
 "Bourrelet Comics", Les Loups Sont Fâchés (France), 2002
 "La nouvelle aux pis", Edition Cornélius, 2002,
 "Morphologie Variable", L'association, 2001
 "La nouvelle aux pis", Cornélius, 2001, 
 "Le Lombric", Cornélius, 1999
 "Mi Yo Malo",(Mon Méchant Moi), Tabasco Carrasco, 1998
 "Mon placard", Schokoriegel, 1997

Books for younger audience 
 "La Reine des Neiges" by Hans Christian Andersen, illustrated by Stéphane Blanquet, Gallimard jeunesse, Giboulées (France), 2011
 "怪物ーーわたしたちのべつの顔？" by Pierre Péju, illustrated by Stéphane Blanquet, 岩崎書店 (Japan), 2011
 "Les Fables de Jean de La Fontaine", illustrated by Stéphane Blanquet, Gallimard jeunesse, Giboulées (France), 2010
 "Les Bêtes d'Ombre" by Anne Sibran, illustrated by Stéphane Blanquet, Gallimard jeunesse, Giboulées (France), 2010
 "Toys in the Basement", Stéphane Blanquet, Fantagraphics (USA), 2010
 "La vieille Chéchette", by Louise Michel, illustrated by Stéphane Blanquet, Albin Michel Jeunesse (France), 2008
 "Sapiencia y artimanas de Socrates, el filosofo de la calle" by Jean-Jacques Barrère & Christian Roche, illustrated by Stéphane Blanquet, Ediciones Tecolote (Mexico), 2007
 "Le monstrueux", by Pierre Péju, illustrated by Stéphane Blanquet, Gallimard jeunesse, Giboulées (France), 2007
 "Sagesses et malices de Socrate, le philosophe de la rue", by Jean-Jacques Barrère & Christian Roche, illustrated by Stéphane Blanquet, Albin Michel (France), 2005
 "Chocottes au sous-sol!" by Blanquet, La Joie de lire (Switzerland), 2005
 "Le roi des crabes", by Blanquet and Olive, Le Seuil (France), 2002

Collective books 
 "Catalogue WHARF (2000–2012)", Edition Wharf, Centre d'art contemporain de Basse-Normandie (France), 2012
 "Coffret Eprouvette", l'Association (France), 2012
 "Black Eye: Graphic Transmissions to Cause Ocular Hypertension", Rotland Press (USA), 2011
 "XX/MMX", l'association (France), 2010
 "Vues sur la ville", par Alain Lachartre, Edition Michel Lagarde (France), 2010
 "Tales of Woe", MTV Book (USA), 2010
 "Illustration Now! 3", Taschen (Germany), 2009
 "Hotwire Comics Vol. 3", edited by Glenn Head, Fantagraphics (USA), 2009
 "Nous sommes Motörhead", Dargaud (France), 2009
 "Beasts! Book 2", edited by Jacob Covey, Fantagraphics (USA), 2008
 "Le muscle Carabine", United Dead Artists (France), 2007
 "Cornélius ou l'art de la mouscaille et du pinaillage", Cornélius (France), 2007
 "Mollusk #03", Bongoût (Germany), 2006
 "Mattt Konture, Archives N°2", L'association (France), 2006
 "Fabuleux Furieux! Hommage en Freak Style", Les Requins Marteaux (France), 2004
 "Color Star", Editions Un sourire de toi et j'quitte ma mère (France), 2004
 "Reiser Forever", Edition Denoël (France), 2003
 "5", Het Besloten Land, (Netherland), 2001
 "Comix 2000", by Jean-Christophe Menu, L'Association (France), 1999

Periodicals 
 "Popper Vol 3 & Vol 9" (Latvia), artworks, 2013
 "Pull de cheval N°1, N°2 & N°3" (France), 2011
 "Hi Fructose N°17" (USA), 2010
 "Illustration Japan N°182" (Japan), 2010
 "Encore N°2" (Japan), 2010
 "Kramer Ergot Vol 7" (USA), edited by Sammy Harkham, 2008
 "Psikopat N°200" (France), May 2008
 "Muscle Carabine" (France), 2008
 "L'Horreur est Humaine Vol 2" (France), 2008
 "L'Horreur est Humaine Vol 1" (France), 2008
 "George N°10" (Belgium), 2008
 "L'Eprouvette N°3" (France), artworks, 2007
 "Vertige N°1", 2002
 "L'Horreur est Humaine N°7", 2002
 "Lapin N°31" (France), 2002
 "Ax N°19" (Japan), 2001
 Blab #9, #10, #11, #13, #14, #15, published by Monte Beauchamp, Fantagraphics Books (USA), 1998

Collections 

His artwork is in private collections in the USA, France, Europe, Malaysia, Japan, the Philippines,… and in public collections, for example:
 Zentralinstitut für Kunstgeschichte, (Munich, Germany)
 Bibliothèque Nationale de France, (Paris, France)
 Centre de ressources et de documentation sur les fanzines et revues amateurs, (Poitiers, France)

References

French artists
1973 births
Living people